(born 9 October 1991) is a Japanese international football player who plays for Renofa Yamaguchi FC as a striker.

Club statistics
Updated to 17 December 2022.

1Includes Japanese Super Cup, J. League Championship and FIFA Club World Cup.

National team statistics

References

External links

 
 Japan National Football Team Database
 
 Profile at Vegalta Sendai
 Profile at Yokohama FC
 Profile at Roasso Kumamoto
 Profile at Sanfrecce Hiroshima
 

1991 births
Living people
Chuo University alumni
Association football people from Saitama Prefecture
Japanese footballers
Japan international footballers
J1 League players
J2 League players
Sanfrecce Hiroshima players
Roasso Kumamoto players
Yokohama FC players
Vegalta Sendai players
Association football forwards
Universiade bronze medalists for Japan
Universiade medalists in football
Medalists at the 2013 Summer Universiade
People from Tokorozawa, Saitama
21st-century Japanese people